Myeongjisan  is a mountain in Gapyeong County, Gyeonggi-do, in  South Korea.

See also
 List of mountains in Korea

Notes

References
 

Mountains of South Korea
Gapyeong County
Mountains of Gyeonggi Province
One-thousanders of South Korea